Harsha de Silva ( born 30 August 1964) is a Sri Lankan economist and politician. He is a Member of Parliament for the Colombo District and former Non-Cabinet Minister of Economic Reforms and Public Distribution; State Minister of National Policies and Economic Affairs; and Deputy Minister of Foreign Affairs. He is a member of Samagi Jana Balawegaya.

Early life 
He was educated at Royal College Colombo, earning a BS in Business Management from Truman State University in 1988. He completed his MA and PhD in Economics at the University of Missouri in 1993. He participated in an executive program on evaluating social programs at the Massachusetts Institute of Technology in 2006 as an Eisenhower Fellow.

Banking career 

As an economist he worked for the DFCC Bank, becoming its chief economist and treasurer. He was co-founder and Joint Managing Director of The Nielsen Company.

He was placed in charge of "Economic Diplomacy" of the government and was a supporter of economic liberalization and trade agreements. He is a supporter of major trade agreements and is a supporter of Sri Lanka joining the Trans Pacific Partnership.

He was the main backer of the Indian-aided project to create a modern EMT and Ambulance service in Sri Lanka. When India offered a gift to Sri Lanka in order to mark Prime Minister Ranil Wickremesinghe's visit, De Silva proposed an emergency medical service after personal experiences with shortcomings in the Sri Lankan system as well the urging of doctors. Wickremesinghe also backed it, leading India's GVK Emergency Response Institute to offer training to hundreds of Sri Lankan EMTs and Paramedics as well as donating ambulances and granting 7.5 million dollars to start the service in Colombo and Galle.

Political career 
He was the Deputy Minister of Policy Planning and Economic Development in the 100-day government. He became known as a media personality who hosted talk shows relating to development and international matters. He voiced his opposition to the economic policies of the previous government. He was instrumental in the formation of the Suwa Seriya Ambulance Service in 2016.

References

External links
Harsha de Silva, PhD

Living people
Sri Lankan economists
Alumni of Royal College, Colombo
Truman State University alumni
University of Missouri alumni
Members of the 14th Parliament of Sri Lanka
Members of the 15th Parliament of Sri Lanka
Members of the 16th Parliament of Sri Lanka
State ministers of Sri Lanka
Deputy ministers of Sri Lanka
Samagi Jana Balawegaya politicians
1964 births